An oenochoe, also spelled oinochoe (from  oînos, "wine" and  khéō, "I pour," sense "wine-pourer"; plural oinochoai; New Latin oenochoë, plural oenochoae, English plural oenochoes or oinochoes), is a wine jug and a key form of ancient Greek pottery. Intermediate between a pithos (large storage vessel) or amphora (transport vessel), and individual cups or bowls, it held fluid for several persons temporarily until it could be poured. The term oinos (Linear B wo-no) appears in Mycenaean Greek, but not the compound. The characteristic form was popular throughout the Bronze Age, especially at prehistoric Troy. In classical times for the most part the term oinochoe implied the distribution of wine. As the word began to diversify in meaning, the shape became a more important identifier than the word. The oinochoe could pour any fluid, not just wine. The English word, pitcher, is perhaps the closest in function.

Beazley's ten types
There are many different forms of oenochoae; Sir John Beazley distinguished ten types. The earliest is the olpe (ὀλπή, olpḗ), with no distinct shoulder and usually a handle rising above the lip. The "type 8 oenochoe" is what one would call a mug, with no single pouring point and a slightly curved profile.  The chous (χοῦς; pl. choes) was a squat rounded form, with trefoil mouth.  Small examples with scenes of children, as in the example illustrated, were placed in the graves of children.

Characteristics of oenochoae
Oenochoae may be decorated or undecorated. They typically have only one handle, which may be opposite a trefoil mouth and pouring spout. At its most distinct development, the trefoil mouth offers three alternative directions of pouring, one opposite the handle, and two to the side, an advantage at a crowded table not afforded by English pitchers.

Most Greek oenochoae were in terracotta, but oenochoae of precious metals were not unknown, presumably among elements of society that could afford them, though but few have survived.  Large versions in stone were sometimes used as grave markers, often carved with reliefs.  In pottery, some oinochoai are "plastic", with the body formed as sculpture, usually one or more human heads.

Prehistoric oenochoae were at first hand-made, unpolished, and undecorated. Low-economy oenochoae remained so, but gradually incised bands with simple motifs such as zig-zags and spirals, or burnished, monochrome surfaces, became common. In the Late Bronze Age the incised bands were painted for a more striking surface, and from then on the Greek oinochoai followed the traditional course of development for Greek decoration. Among the higher-quality pots, quite a few masterpieces have survived.

Gallery of oenochoae

See also
 Typology of Greek vase shapes
 Corpus vasorum antiquorum
 Ancient Greek vase painting
 Pottery of ancient Greece

References

External links
 

Storage vessels
Ancient Greek pot shapes
Wine packaging and storage